James Elishama Smith, often called Shepherd Smith (1801, Glasgow – 1857, Glasgow) was a British journalist and religious writer.

Smith studied at Glasgow University. Hearing Edward Irving preach in 1828, he became a millenarian and associated with followers of Joanna Southcott. For a couple of years he became a Christian Israelite under John Wroe. He moved to London in 1832, and his millenarianism turned socialist. He translated Saint-Simon, edited Robert Owen's journal Crisis, and wrote for James Morrison's Pioneer.

Smith edited The Shepherd 1834–5 and 1837–8, and wrote leaders for the Penny Satirist. In 1843 he founded a penny weekly, the Family Herald, which at one point approached a circulation of half a million.

Works
The Anti-Christ, or, Christianity Reformed, 1833
The Divine Drama of History and Civilization, 1854
The Coming Man, 1873

External links
Timothy C. F. Stunt, ‘Smith, James Elishama (Shepherd Smith) (1801–1857)’, Oxford Dictionary of National Biography, Oxford University Press, 2004

1801 births
1857 deaths
British male journalists
Christian writers
British socialists
19th-century British journalists
Male journalists
19th-century British male writers